Long Xiaohua (born December 1963) is a former Chinese politician of Miao ethicity who spent her entire career in her home-province Hunan. As of February 2023 she was under investigation by China's top anti-corruption agency. Previously she served as governor of Xiangxi Tujia and Miao Autonomous Prefecture.

She was a delegate to the 13th National People's Congress.

Early life and education
Long was born in Huayuan County, Hunan, in December 1963. After resuming the college entrance examination in 1978, Long entered Xiangxi Tujia and Miao Autonomous Prefecture Agricultural School, where she majored in tea and fruits. Long also graduated from Jishou University, Hunan University of Technology and Business, Hunan University, and the Central Party School of the Chinese Communist Party.

Career
After graduating in 1981, Long was assigned as a technician and assistant agronomist at Jishou Municipal Agricultural Bureau, and became an office cadre of Jishou Municipal Agricultural Committee in August 1984. She joined the Chinese Communist Party (CCP) in June 1985.

In July 1989, Long was reassigned as director of the Office of the People's Government of Xiangxi Tujia and Miao Autonomous Prefecture, and became a secretary for its Secretary Section in June of the following year.

Long was a secretary for the General Office of Hunan Provincial Committee of the Chinese People's Political Consultative Conference in April 1993 and subsequently the Office of Hunan Provincial Ethnic Affairs Commission four months later. In September 1994, she became deputy director of the Office, rising to director in October 2000.

Long served as deputy director of Hunan Provincial Office Affairs Administration in January 2002, and eight years later promoted to the director position.

In December 2016, Long was named acting governor and deputy party secretary of Xiangxi Tujia and Miao Autonomous Prefecture, confirmed in January 2017.

In January 2023, Long was chosen as chairperson of the Economic and Technological Committee of Hunan Provincial Committee of the Chinese People's Political Consultative Conference.

Downfall
On 19 February 2023, Long has been placed under investigation for "serious violations of laws and regulations" by the Central Commission for Discipline Inspection (CCDI), the party's internal disciplinary body, and the National Supervisory Commission, the highest anti-corruption agency of China.

References

1963 births
Living people
People from Huayuan County
Miao people
Jishou University alumni
Hunan University of Technology and Business alumni
Hunan University alumni
Central Party School of the Chinese Communist Party alumni
People's Republic of China politicians from Hunan
Chinese Communist Party politicians from Hunan
Governors of Xiangxi Tujia and Miao Autonomous Prefecture
Delegates to the 13th National People's Congress